Emmanuel Maquet (born 2 June 1968) is a French Republican politician who has represented Somme's 3rd constituency in the National Assembly since 2017.

References

External links 
 Official website

1968 births
Living people
Politicians from Normandy
University of Rouen Normandy alumni
The Republicans (France) politicians
People from Dieppe, Seine-Maritime
Deputies of the 15th National Assembly of the French Fifth Republic
Deputies of the 16th National Assembly of the French Fifth Republic